Israelite highland settlement refers to an ancient Israelite settlement in the highlands north of Jerusalem discovered in archaeological field surveys conducted in Israel since the 1970s.

These surveys found a large increase in the settled population dating to 1200 BCE. It is not known whether the Israelites arrived in the wake of conquests or the new villages were established by former nomads or displaced persons. A similar increase was not found in the surrounding lowland areas. According to archaeological evidence, these areas may have been inhabited by Canaanites or Sea People.

A 2005 book by Robert D. Miller  applies statistical modeling to the sizes and locations of the villages, grouping them by economic and political features.  He found highland groupings centered on Dothan, Tirzah, Shechem, and Shiloh. The tribal territory of Benjamin was not organized around any main town.

This evidence does not prove there was a conquest as described in the Book of Joshua, but if the biblical reference to "daughter villages" means all villages closest to a specific town, the list of Canaanite towns not taken in the Book of Judges, which begins: "Nor did Manesseh drive out Bet Shean and her daughter-villages ...", the correspondence to the survey results is remarkably accurate. Towns not captured in the central zone were Taanach, Ibleam, Megiddo, Dor, Gezer, Aijalon, Shaalbim, and Jerusalem.

See also
 Archaeology of Israel
 Biblical archaeology
 Judaean Mountains
 List of Biblical names

Bibliography

1970s archaeological discoveries

Ancient Israel and Judah
Biblical archaeology
Hebrew Bible mountains
Israelites